"Näytän sulle rannan" ("I Will Show You the Beach") is the third single by Finnish singer Jesse Kaikuranta from his debut album Vie mut kotiin. It was released as a digital single on 25 January 2013.

Chart performance 

"Näytän sulle rannan" peaked at number 13 on the Official Finnish Download Chart.

Charts

References

2013 singles
Finnish-language songs
Jesse Kaikuranta songs